There are various intersections of the LGBTQ+ community and Wikipedia. LGBTQ+ people who edit Wikipedia may face harassment, and Wikipedia content about LGBTQ+ individuals is often vandalized, but various Wikipedia user groups and the Wikimedia Foundation have endorsed campaigns to promote inclusion on Wikipedia, and its availability in nations that otherwise suppress information about LGBTQ+ issues has been praised.

LGBT coverage 
In 2019, Rachel Wexelbaum wrote, "For LGBTIQ+ people and those searching for LGBTIQ+ information, Wikipedia has proven invaluable in countries where LGBTIQ+ publications, media, or visibility may be criminalized or cut short due to AIDS NGOs leaving those countries." It can also be valuable for those in communities where this information is socially marginalized, as was the experience of Abby Stein in finding transgender identity.

In some cases, particular language editions of Wikipedia have had issues of slanted anti-LGBT content. The Croatian Wikipedia has come under scrutiny for promoting fascism, whitewashing World War II concentration camps, and anti-Serbian and anti-LGBT propaganda. At one point, the only active administrator of Amharic Wikipedia enforced the Ethiopian government's anti-LGBT laws on the wiki.

Names and pronouns 
Articles about transgender and non-binary individuals are often subject to vandals who edit the article to misgender the subject, despite Wikipedia's guideline that articles should use the gender corresponding with the subject's most recently stated gender. In August 2008, the page of trans CNET journalist Ina Fried was caught up in an edit war over the pronouns used on the page.

After Chelsea Manning confirmed her preferred name and pronouns in August 2013, editors debated the title of the entry about her. At the time, Slate praised actions by Wikipedia editors, saying that Manning's page was rewritten quickly and with "remarkably little controversy". However, in October 2013, The Guardian noted that the Arbitration Committee of English Wikipedia had "banned a number of editors from working on articles related to transgender topics or individuals," noting what while some were banned for "making transphobic comments about Manning", others received the same punishment "for pointing out the bigotry in the first place." 

Following Caitlyn Jenner's gender transition in 2015, Kat George of Bustle wrote, "We can start learning about the proper use of gender pronouns, with Caitlyn Jenner's Wikipedia page as a perfect example of the correct before and after language we should be employing."

Editors had debated the name and pronouns to use in the article on Gloria Hemingway for 15 years. In February 2022, after a week of debate and long discussions, votes were evenly split between using Gloria and "she/her" pronouns or continuing to use her deadname. An editor closed the discussion in favor of renaming; the decision was appealed but upheld by an administrator.

Harassment 
LGBT Wikipedia editors have experienced harassment, including deadnaming and doxxing. The Wikimedia Foundation has said it is seriously concerned about the idea that transgender editors could be repelled from Wikipedia due to online abuse. BBC News said in 2020, "Many, particularly women and members of the LGBTQ community, have complained of abuse and harassment from other editors."

Editors in countries where it is more dangerous to be LGBT experience more virulent harassment. In one instance, an editor was blocked by an administrator since their username suggested they may be gay. The administrator was eventually blocked for those actions when Wikimedia's Trust and Safety Team got involved. Amir Sarabadani, an editor, stated that in 12 years of editing Persian Wikipedia, users were often hostile to articles related to homosexuality. Other editors often accused him of having a "homosexual agenda" and anonymous users posted lewd images to his user page. He said that his work as an administrator there helped make abuse less tolerable and that homophobic content that was previously acceptable now resulted in blocks.

In 2022, a group of 40 French public figures signed an open letter to Wikipedia denouncing "stigmatizing behaviors" against transgender, non-binary, and intersex people on Wikipedia including misgendering, deadnaming, the use of pre-transition pictures, and harassment of openly trans editors.

Wikimedia movement 

The Wikimedia movement has seen campaigns and hosted edit-a-thons to improve coverage of LGBT topics. According to The Hindu, Wiki Loves Pride is "a global campaign to expand and improve LGBT-related content across Wikimedia projects. The campaign focuses on the June to October period, when LGBTs around the world celebrate their community." Wiki Loves Pride has promoted coverage of notable LGBT people. Art+Feminism has been described as "a campaign to improve the site's representation of women and nonbinary individuals".

In 2022, the Wikimedia Foundation joined human rights and LGBTQ+ organizations in opposing the Kids Online Safety Act. The groups argued that "over-moderation" would "cut off members of marginalized younger groups who rely on online services to learn about sex education or access LGBTQ+ resources". Wikimedia LGBT is a user group affiliate of the Wikimedia Foundation.

References

External links

 Queering Wikipedia (January 2015)

LGBT and society
Wikipedia content